Marlborough Building, also known as Marlborough Hotel, State Bank of Binghamton, State Hotel, and Marble Grill, is a historic building located at Binghamton in Broome County, New York. It was built in 1914 and is a three-story, five bay commercial building with a one-story addition and upper level stacked porches projecting from the rear.  The front facade features a stepped parapet with a cast cartouche ornamented with foliage flanked by decorative cast stone foliage.  It was built as a hotel and housed a bank on its first floor until 1930.  From the 1940s to 1990s, the first floor was used for commercial establishments with apartments above.

It was listed on the National Register of Historic Places in 2008.

References

External links

Buildings and structures in Binghamton, New York
Commercial buildings on the National Register of Historic Places in New York (state)
National Register of Historic Places in Broome County, New York
Hotel buildings completed in 1914
Hotel buildings on the National Register of Historic Places in New York (state)
Bank buildings on the National Register of Historic Places in New York (state)